Marilyn Villamayor is a Filipino actress, host, singer and producer. She was a former teen star and host of That's Entertainment on GMA Network in the late 1980s and early 1990s. She was introduced in the "Superstar" show when she was 14 years old and hosted a television show, Lotlot and friends, and Dr. Potpot and the Satellite Kid, together with her cousins Lotlot de Leon and Ian de Leon. She also appeared in a number of feature films.

Filmography

Film
Sa Lungga ng Mga Daga (1978)
Ma'am May We Go Out? (1985)
Halimaw sa Banga (1986)
Tatlong Ina, Isang Anak (1987)
Takot Ako, Eh! (1987)
Nakausap Ko ang Birhen (1988)
Bobo Cop (1988)
Bagwis (1990)
Feel Na Feel (1990)
Hotdog (1990)
Ang Buhay ni Pacita M. (1991)

Television guest appearances
Lovingly Yours, Helen (GMA 7)
Maalaala Mo Kaya (ABS CBN) as Belen, date aired January 21, 2017 
Pera at Diploma (1991)
Mr. Kupido (ABS-CBN)
Ipaglaban Mo (ABS-CBN)
Kris (ABS-CBN)
SIS (GMA 7)
Young Love, Sweet Love (RPN 9)
Eat Bulaga (GMA 7)
Lunch Date (GMA 7)
Kwarta o Kahon (RPN 9)
Teysi ng Tahanan (ABS-CBN)
Coney Reyes on Camera (RPN 9)
Walang Tulugan (GMA-7), 2016
Maynila (GMA-7)
"My Dear Heart" as Teresa, date aired February 7 and 8, 2017 (ABS CBN)
Magpakailanman
Dear Uge
FPJs Ang Probinsyano

TV seriesLotlot and Friends (1987)
Dr. Potpot and the Satellite Kid (1985) as MaxiBridges of Love (2015) as Mama ChandaMy Fair Lady'' (Philippine Version) 2015 as Violy

References

Living people
Filipino film actresses
Filipino television actresses
Year of birth missing (living people)